Willard Hall (December 24, 1780 – May 10, 1875), was a Delaware attorney and politician from Wilmington in New Castle County. He was a member of the Democratic-Republican Party, who served in the Delaware Senate, as a United States representative from Delaware and as a United States district judge of the United States District Court for the District of Delaware. He served as the first President of the Delaware Historical Society, was President of the state Bible society, and was instrumental in the formation of the Wilmington Savings Fund Society as a community bank, serving as its President for more than 40 years.

Education and career

Born on December 24, 1780, in Westford, Massachusetts, Hall attended the public schools and Westford Academy. He graduated from Harvard University in 1799 and read law in 1803. He was admitted to the bar and entered private practice in Dover, Delaware from 1803 to 1823. He was Secretary of State of Delaware from 1811 to 1814, and from 1821 to 1823.

Congressional service

Hall was elected as a Democratic-Republican from Delaware's at-large congressional district to the United States House of Representatives of the 15th United States Congress. He was reelected to the 16th United States Congress and served from March 4, 1817, until January 22, 1821, when he resigned. He was an unsuccessful candidate in 1820 for reelection to the 17th United States Congress. He was a member of the Delaware Senate in 1822. He was the compiler of the Revised Code of Delaware in 1829. He was a delegate to the Delaware constitutional convention in 1821.

Federal judicial service

Hall received a recess appointment from President James Monroe on May 6, 1823, to a seat on the United States District Court for the District of Delaware vacated by Judge John Fisher. He was nominated to the same position by President Monroe on December 5, 1823. He was confirmed by the United States Senate on December 9, 1823, and received his commission the same day. His service terminated on December 6, 1871, due to his retirement.

Other service

Hall was President of the Wilmington School Board from 1852 to 1870. Hall was also the first President of the Delaware Historical Society. In September 1831, Hall was among twenty-five founding members elected to serve on the board of the newly formed Wilmington Savings Fund Society, a community bank designed to provide persons with only modest savings a safe place to deposit their funds. On October 1, 1831, Hall was elected president of the bank, a position he held until 1872, when he retired at the age of 92.

Death

Hall died on May 10, 1875, in Wilmington, Delaware, where he had moved in 1825. He was interred in the Wilmington and Brandywine Cemetery in Wilmington.

Family

In 1806, Hall married Junia Killen, the daughter of Chancellor William Killen and they had a daughter, Lucinda. Junia died in 1826 and Hall married Harriet Hillyard.

Religious service

Hall served as a ruling elder and Sunday School teacher in the Presbyterian Church.

Electoral history

See also
List of United States federal judges by longevity of service

References

Sources

External links
 

 Delaware's Members of Congress
 The Political Graveyard

Places with more information
 Delaware Historical Society; website; 505 North Market Street, Wilmington, Delaware 19801; (302) 655-7161
 University of Delaware; Library website; 181 South College Avenue, Newark, Delaware 19717; (302) 831–2965

1780 births
1875 deaths
American Presbyterians
Burials at Wilmington and Brandywine Cemetery
People from Dover, Delaware
People from Wilmington, Delaware
Delaware lawyers
Secretaries of State of Delaware
Delaware state senators
Judges of the United States District Court for the District of Delaware
United States federal judges appointed by James Monroe
19th-century American judges
Harvard University alumni
People from Westford, Massachusetts
Democratic-Republican Party members of the United States House of Representatives from Delaware
19th-century American politicians